Ashireh-ye Khalaf (also Romanized as ʿAshīreh-ye Khalāf; also known as ‘Ashīreh-ye Ḩalāf and Ḩallāf) is a village in Seyyed Abbas Rural District, Shavur District, Shush County, Khuzestan Province, Iran. At the 2006 census, its population was 270, in 40 families.

References 

Populated places in Shush County